Alcinda Helena Panguana (born 27 February 1994, in Maputo) is a boxer from Mozambique. She competed in the women's welterweight event at the 2020 Summer Olympics. She won against Elizabeth Akinyi in the Round of 16. She lost to China's Gu Hong in the quarterfinals.

References

External links

1994 births
Living people
Mozambican women boxers
Welterweight boxers
AIBA Women's World Boxing Championships medalists
Olympic boxers of Mozambique
Boxers at the 2020 Summer Olympics
Sportspeople from Maputo
African Games silver medalists for Mozambique
African Games medalists in boxing
Competitors at the 2019 African Games